Singapur is a census town in Mancherial district in the Indian state of Telangana.

Geography 

Demographics 
 India census, Singapur had a population of 23,458. Males constitute 51% of the population and females 49%. Singapur has an average literacy rate of 55%, lower than the national average of 59.5%: male literacy is 62%, and female literacy is 48%. In Singapur, 11% of the population is under 6 years of age.

References 

Census towns in Adilabad district